Barkur railway station is a station on Konkan Railway, it's code is BKJ. It serves to Brahmavar taluk and its surroundings. Panchaganga Express has stop at Barkur railway station. It is at a distance of  down from origin. The preceding station on the line is Kundapura railway station and the next station is Udupi railway station.

References 

Railway stations along Konkan Railway line
Railway stations in Udupi district
Karwar railway division